Vora June Shaw Stewart (née Mackintosh) (2 June 1929 – 30 April 1998) was a British alpine skier. She competed in two events at the 1952 Winter Olympics.

A series of photographic portraits of Vora as a child with her family, taken by Bassano Ltd, are held in the collection of the National Portrait Gallery, London.

References

External links
 

1929 births
1998 deaths
British female alpine skiers
Olympic alpine skiers of Great Britain
Alpine skiers at the 1952 Winter Olympics
Sportspeople from London